Karry Auto is a Chinese car manufacturer founded by Chery Automobile in 2009 specializing in the production of light commercial vehicles and people carriers for passenger transport. It is a subsidiary of Chery Commercial Vehicle (Anhui) Co. Ltd. and is based in Anhui, Wuhu in China.

History 

The name Karry made its first appearance in the early 2000s as a commercial vehicle model within the Chery range (the Karry A18). It was a box version of the Chery Fulwin (licensed version of the first generation Seat Toledo). Subsequently, Karry launched other commercial vehicles re-branded Karry creating a sub-brand to distinguish it from the remaining purely automotive production.

In 2009 all commercial vehicle activities were separated with the creation of the Chery Commercial Vehicle based in Anhui and the Karry Auto (or simply Karry) brand was created. In addition to vans and other small minivans designed specifically for the Chinese market, a pick-up (Karry Aika) was launched on the Isuzu TF chassis and a design copied from the Chevrolet Colorado and a light truck with cabin similar to the European and Japanese models (like Iveco EuroCargo and Mitsubishi-Fuso Canter).

From 2014 the range expands also introducing minivans designed specifically for the Chinese market and projects developed with the Chery New Energy division to bring the first electric vehicles into production.

In late 2016, Karry and the Chery Commercial Vehicle division began the design of low-cost SUVs and off-road vehicles which, however, were subsequently launched by another brand created by Chery, Jetour, to avoid internal competition with the parent company.

Today the Karry brand is present only on the Chinese market, however some models are marketed by the parent company Chery with its own brand both in South America and in some countries of Southeast Asia.

Product models 
 Karry A18
 Karry Q21
 Karry S21
 Karry Q22
 Karry K50
 Karry K60
 Karry T-series
 Karry Aika
 Karry Higgo (Jiehu)
 Karry Dolphin (Haitun)
 Karry Porpoise (Jiangtun)/ Karry X6 
 Karry Elephant (Dà xiàng)
 Karry Youya

See also

List of automobile manufacturers of China

References

External links

 Official China website

Truck manufacturers of China
Chery
Companies based in Wuhu
Vehicle manufacturing companies established in 1997
Chinese companies established in 2009
Chinese brands
Car brands